Jakovich or Yakovich is a surname. Notable people with the surname include:

Allen Jakovich (born 1968), Australian rules footballer
Glen Jakovich (born 1973), Australian rules footballer, brother of Allen
Yuri Yakovich (born 1962), Russian chess grandmaster

See also
Jankovich (surname)

Surnames from given names